The rufescent screech owl (Megascops ingens) is a species of owl in the family Strigidae. It is found in Bolivia, Colombia, Ecuador, Peru, and Venezuela.

Taxonomy and systematics

The rufescent screech owl has three subspecies, the nominate M. i. ingens, M. i. venezuelanus, and M. i. columbianus. The last was formerly considered a distinct species, "Colombian screech owl". Two other forms that had previously been described as subspecies are now treated as individual variations of the nominate.

Description

The rufescent screech owl is one of the larger species of its genus, similar in size to the white-throated screech owl (M. albogularis). The nominate subspecies is sandy brown above with darker vermiculation. Its facial disc is sandy brown, without a distinct rim. The flight feathers are barred cinnamon and dusky and the tail is cinnamon with darker brown bars. The hind crown has buffy-whitish border. It has honey brown eyes and small ear tufts. The tarsi are feathered to the base of the toes. M. i. venezuelanus is slightly smaller and paler than the nominate. M. columbianus is also smaller than the nominate and its tarsi are not fully feathered.

Distribution and habitat

The nominate subspecies of rufescent screech owl is found on the eastern slope of the Andes from southwestern Colombia through Ecuador and Peru to central Bolivia. M. i. venezuelanus is found in northern Colombia and northwestern Venezuela; its elevational range has not been determined. M. columbianus is found on the western slope of the Andes from west central Colombia into northwestern Ecuador.

The rufescent screech owl inhabits a wide variety of forest types including the interior and edges of mature evergreen and secondary forest and pastures with scattered trees. It appears to accept fragmented habitats.

Behavior

Feeding

The rufescent screech owl is nocturnal, like most others of its genus. Its hunting techniques have not been documented. Its diet is assumed to be larger insects and spiders, and at least one small vertebrate has been noted as prey.

Breeding

The rufescent screech owl's breeding phenology is essentially undocumented. In western Colombia it is believed to nest between December and March. Though its nest and eggs have not been described, it is assumed to nest in a tree cavity like others of its genus.

Vocalization

The rufescent screech owl's primary (territorial) song is "a series of flute-like, staccato notes, which begins softly on a lower pitch, shortly rising to a higher, steadily maintained pitch". A second song, believed to be used in courtship, is "a 2-3 weak introductory notes followed by a short series of hoots all on the same pitch". Both sexes sing both songs, though the females' are higher pitched.

Status

The IUCN has assessed the rufescent screech owl as being of Least Concern. However, its population is unknown and believed to be decreasing. It is "vulnerable to deforestation, which is advancing throughout its range".

References

Further reading

 "Owls: A Guide to the Owls of the World" by Claus Konig, Friedhelm Welck & Jan-Hendrik Becking. Yale University Press (1999), .

rufescent screech owl
Birds of the Northern Andes
rufescent screech owl
rufescent screech owl
Taxonomy articles created by Polbot